Charles Schreiner may refer to:

 Schreiner's, also known as Charles Schreiner & Company, a department store in Kerrville, Texas
 Charles Schreiner (Texas rancher) (1838–1927), cattle and sheep rancher, merchant, banker, politician, and philanthropist
 Charles Schreiner, III (1927–2001), his grandson, rancher and historian

Schreiner, Charles